Bathymophila bairdii is a species of sea snail, a marine gastropod mollusk, in the family Solariellidae.

References

Solariellidae
Gastropods described in 1889